August Nus Polygonal Barn is a historic building located east of Arlington, Iowa, United States. Built in 1906, this was one of four flat
roofed barns that were known to exist in Iowa, and it was the oldest of the four. The 12-sided structure with horizontal wood siding was built around a central silo that extends above the barn. Eventually, it had a cone shaped roof. The barn was listed on the National Register of Historic Places in 1986.

References

Infrastructure completed in 1906
Buildings and structures in Fayette County, Iowa
National Register of Historic Places in Fayette County, Iowa
Barns on the National Register of Historic Places in Iowa
Polygonal barns in the United States
1906 establishments in Iowa